Charles W. Whipple (1805, Fort Wayne, Indiana – January 1856) was an American attorney, politician who served as Speaker of the Michigan House of Representatives, and chief justice of the Michigan Supreme Court. He was the secretary of the Michigan constitutional convention of 1835 and a delegate to the convention of 1850. Further, Whipple served as secretary of the second session of the Sixth Legislative Council.

Whipple's father, Major John Whipple, was an officer during the War of 1812 and served under Mad Anthony Wayne.

References

External links

1805 births
1856 deaths
Speakers of the Michigan House of Representatives
Democratic Party members of the Michigan House of Representatives
Chief Justices of the Michigan Supreme Court
Politicians from Fort Wayne, Indiana
United States Military Academy alumni
Regents of the University of Michigan
19th-century American judges
19th-century American politicians
Justices of the Michigan Supreme Court